The gaze is a concept in visual culture dealing with the process of self-awareness or awareness of others.

Gaze may also refer to:

 Gaze (album), by the Beautiful South
 Gaze (band), a Canadian pop band
 Gaze (film festival), an annual LGBT event in Dublin, Ireland
 Gaze (physiology), a coordinated motion of the eyes and neck
 Gaze (surname), a list of people with the name
 GAZE, a Basque term (gazte ekinzale) that refers to an entrepreneurial youth
 The Gaze (novel), a 1999 novel by Elif Shafak

See also
 Gêrzê County or Gaize County, Tibet